Pa Dembo Touray (born 31 March 1980,), is the goalkeeper coach of Prespa Birlik. He is a former Gambian football goalkeeper and national team player for Gambia.

Club career
Touray, an English spelling of the name "Touré", began his footballing career with Real de Banjul F.C. in Gambia. In 2000, he moved to Stockholm in Sweden to play for Djurgårdens IF in the highest domestic league, Allsvenskan. Touray spent two respective loan spells with Assyriska FF and Vålerenga IF before returning to Djurgårdens IF following the sale of Swedish international goalkeeper Andreas Isaksson.

After Isaksson's departure, Touray was handed an extended run in the team, and since maintained his position as first-choice goalkeeper at the club. He was also rewarded with the club captaincy after several seasons of consistency and following the 2011 season was selected as the top goalkeeper in the Allsvenskan. At the conclusion of the 2011 season, after a decade at Djurgårdens IF Touray left the club having appeared in 195 league matches.

Touray is one of the most celebrated fan-favorites of Djurgårdens IF, having stayed at the club for more than a decade & during one of the club's most successful spells in history. Touray is also well known for singing the West African song "Kamala, Kamala Vesta" as a victory chant, sung by Touray & repeated by the singing stand, which has become a tradition for the club ever since.

International career
Touray has been capped 25 times for Gambia.

Career statistics

Honours 

 Djurgårdens IF 
 Superettan: 2000
 Allsvenskan: 2003, 2005
 Svenska Cupen: 2004, 2005
Individual
 Årets Järnkamin: 2006,  2010

References

External links
Profile at Djurgårdens IF site 

1980 births
Living people
Sportspeople from Banjul
Gambian footballers
Association football goalkeepers
Real de Banjul FC players
Allsvenskan players
Superettan players
Eliteserien players
Djurgårdens IF Fotboll players
Vålerenga Fotball players
Santos F.C. (South Africa) players
Vasalunds IF players
IFK Lidingö players
The Gambia international footballers
Gambian expatriate footballers
Gambian expatriate sportspeople in Sweden
Expatriate footballers in Sweden
Expatriate footballers in Norway
Expatriate soccer players in South Africa